Monica Boggioni (born 5 August 1998) is an Italian Paralympic swimmer who competes in international level events. She competed at the 2020 Summer Paralympics, winning bronze medals in the 100 metre freestyle S5, and 200 metre freestyle S5.

Career 
She graduated from University of Pavia. She competed at the 2017 World Para Swimming Championships, and 2019 World Para Swimming Championships. She was recently reclassified to an S5 swimmer.

References

External links 
 
 

1998 births
Living people
Sportspeople from Pavia
Italian female freestyle swimmers
Paralympic swimmers of Italy
Medalists at the World Para Swimming Championships
Medalists at the World Para Swimming European Championships
Swimmers at the 2020 Summer Paralympics
Medalists at the 2020 Summer Paralympics
Paralympic bronze medalists for Italy
Paralympic medalists in swimming
University of Pavia alumni
Italian female medley swimmers
Italian female backstroke swimmers
Italian female breaststroke swimmers
S5-classified Paralympic swimmers
21st-century Italian women